One Hundred Years of Homosexuality: and other essays on Greek love is a 1990 book about homosexuality in ancient Greece by the classicist David M. Halperin, in which the author supports the social constructionist school of thought associated with the French philosopher Michel Foucault. The work has been praised by several scholars, but criticized by others, some of whom have attributed to Halperin the view that the coining of the word "homosexuality" in the nineteenth century brought homosexuality into existence. The book was often reviewed alongside John J. Winkler's The Constraints of Desire (1990).

Summary

In Halperin's view, the introduction of the term "homosexual" in the 1892 English translation of Richard von Krafft-Ebing's Psycopathia sexuallis by Charles Gilbert Chaddock marks an important change in the treatment and consideration of homosexuality. Halperin believes that the appearance of the English translation of the first volume of Foucault's The History of Sexuality in 1978, together with the publication of the classicist Kenneth Dover's Greek Homosexuality the same year, marked the beginning of a new era in the study of the history of sexuality. Halperin suggests that The History of Sexuality may be the most important contribution to the history of western morality since Friedrich Nietzsche's On the Genealogy of Morality (1887).

Publication history
One Hundred Years of Homosexuality was first published in 1990 by Routledge.

Reception

Mainstream media
One Hundred Years of Homosexuality received a mixed review from the classicist Jasper Griffin in The New York Review of Books and a positive review from the philosopher Martha Nussbaum in The Times Literary Supplement. Both reviewed the book alongside John J. Winkler's The Constraints of Desire (1990).

Griffin called Halperin's work learned but suggested that he exaggerated ideas drawn from Foucault. Griffin wrote that Halperin did not "succeed in disproving the natural reading of a number of Greek texts, which is that some forms of sexual activity were discountenanced, and that some people were categorized by their sexual activities." Halperin responded that it was not his aim to demonstrate that sexual stigma did not exist in Ancient Greece. In reply, Griffin accused Halperin of inconsistency on the issue.

Nussbaum called Halperin and Winkler "judicious and discriminating classical scholars" with a "mastery of the relevant types of evidence" superior to that of Foucault. She described their books as "important collections" that were "meticulous and reliable in scholarship, clear in argument." She credited Halperin with providing "careful scholarly arguments" and making a "wide-ranging use of the evidence."

Gay media
One Hundred Years of Homosexuality was reviewed in the New York Native, and received subsequent discussions there, one of which presented the book alongside Winkler's The Constraints of Desire (1990). The book was also reviewed by Michael Schwartz in OutWeek and the novelist John Gilgun in the James White Review, and discussed by the novelist Andrew Holleran in Christopher Street and the poet Jason Schneiderman in The Gay & Lesbian Review Worldwide.

Schneiderman, responding to the playwright Larry Kramer's criticism of queer theory and the refusal of academics associated with it "to believe that homosexuality has been pretty much the same since the beginning of human history", credited Halperin with offering the strongest objection to a "universal notion" of homosexuality.

Academic journals
One Hundred Years of Homosexuality received a negative review from the critic Camille Paglia in Arion. The book was also reviewed by the classicist Kenneth Dover in Classical Review, Richard Hoffman in the Journal of Homosexuality, John F. Makowski in Classical World, Philip Holden in Canadian Literature, David Cohen in Classical Philology, and Peter Laipson in Comparative Studies in Society and History, and discussed by Carolyn Dinshaw in GLQ.

Paglia noted that the book had been praised by numerous scholars. However, she strongly disagreed with their assessment of it, and accused Halperin of poor scholarship, careerism, and over-valuing Foucault's ideas. Paglia found the work pretentious and confused, and expressed dismay at Nussbaum's positive review. She criticized Halperin for implying that homosexuals and homosexuality did not exist until the word "homosexuality" was coined and for basing conclusions about the views of classical Athenians on Aristophanes' speech in Plato's Symposium, noting that "Aristophanes is a literary characters and not the real-life man on which he was based". She contrasted the book unfavorably with John J. Winkler's The Constraints of Desire (1990), which she described as a "closely associated" work. However, she also criticized Winkler on various grounds.

Dinshaw described One Hundred Years of Homosexuality as a "polemical book".

Other evaluations
The journalist Neil Miller commended the book for its lucidity, while the literature scholar Leonard Barkan called it "brilliant". In Forms of Desire (1990), the philosopher Edward Stein called Halperin's reservations about scientific research "provocative and highly contentious". In The Mismeasure of Desire (1999), Stein wrote that Halperin's views about the development of contemporary categories of sexual orientation are not universally shared: while Halperin maintains that the word "homosexual" was coined by Karl-Maria Kertbeny in 1869 and attaches significance to this event, others, such as John Boswell, argue that the concept the word refers to has existed for centuries. The sociologist Gary W. Dowsett observed that Halperin, like Foucault in The History of Sexuality, redraws "the terms of our understanding of ancient male-to-male sexual activity and man-boy love", and that he does so with a "view to the politics of the late twentieth century". Dowsett saw Halperin's views as following those of both Foucault and the poet and literary critic John Addington Symonds, maintaining that all three present a censored and overly idealized picture of homosexuality and sexual activity in general. The neuroscientist Simon LeVay observed in Queer Science (1996) that the title of One Hundred Years of Homosexuality, "encapsulates...the notion that homosexuality was brought into existence by the invention, in the late nineteenth century, of the word used to define it." LeVay criticized Halperin's social constructionist arguments, arguing that the concept of homosexuality can exist without the word and that homosexuality itself exists independently of the concept. LeVay found Halperin's interpretation of the Symposium strained, noting that while according to Halperin Aristophanes divides men-loving men into youths who love adult men and adult men who love youths, Aristophanes represents the two kinds of love as "different stages on a single life course." LeVay suggested that Halperin's form of social constructionism replaces consciousness with "a highly linguistic self-consciousness".

The psychologist Jim McKnight observed that Halperin is one of several critics of evolutionary explanations of homosexuality who "argue that homosexuality is not an innate but rather an acquired behavior and that Darwinistic explanations are spurious or ultimately misguided". McKnight granted the possibility that Halperin and the other critics may be correct. Nussbaum credited Halperin with providing a good discussion of the relevance of the idea that homosexuality is a cultural construct to ancient Greek culture. The economist Richard Posner described Halperin's view that homosexuality was "invented" by European psychiatrists as a thesis representative of social constructionism. The classicist Bruce Thornton endorsed Paglia's criticisms of Halperin and Winkler. Timothy F. Murphy wrote in Gay Science (1997) that while Halperin claims that erotic preferences are no more fundamental than dietary preferences and should therefore be explained in cultural rather than biological terms, dietary habits themselves can be explained partly in terms of inherent human needs for proteins, fats, and sugars. He criticized Halperin for claiming that the discovery of a gene for homosexuality would refute his ideas about the cultural determination of sexual object-choice, since social constructionism can be interpreted as claiming that sexual orientation is inevitably influenced by social forces and thus does not rule out scientific investigation of the origins of homosexuality.

References

Bibliography
Books

 
 
 
 
 
 
 
 
 
 
 
 
 

Journals

  
  
  
  
 
  
  
  
  
  
 
  
  
  
  
  

Online articles

 

1990 non-fiction books
1990s LGBT literature
Books about the philosophy of sexuality
Books by David M. Halperin
English-language books
Books about LGBT history
Routledge books
LGBT literature in the United States